Juan Yagüe y Blanco, 1st Marquis of San Leonardo de Yagüe (19 November 1891 – 21 October 1952) was a Spanish military officer during the Spanish Civil War, one of the most important in the Nationalist side. He became known as the "Butcher of Badajoz" (Carnicero de Badajoz) because he ordered thousands killed, including wounded men in the hospital.

Early life

The son of a doctor, he enrolled at a young age in the Toledo Infantry Academy, where Francisco Franco was a fellow cadet. The two men received their commissions concurrently and served together in Africa, where Yagüe was wounded on several occasions and received several decorations.

Yagüe was promoted to lieutenant colonel in 1932. He, along with Franco and General Eduardo López Ochoa, helped suppress a workers uprising in Asturias using Moroccan Regulars and Legionnaires in 1934. He was a strong early supporter of the Falange Española and a close personal friend of José Antonio Primo de Rivera.

Spanish Civil War

When Niceto Alcalá-Zamora was replaced as President of the Republic by the left-wing Manuel Azaña on 10 May 1936, a group of Spanish Army officers, including Yagüe, Emilio Mola, Franco, Gonzalo Queipo de Llano and José Sanjurjo, started plotting to overthrow the democratically elected Popular Front government. This led to a military uprising which precipitated the Spanish Civil War on 17 July 1936.

Yagüe's forces revolted in Ceuta before crossing the Straits of Gibraltar to link up with Nationalist forces in Seville, led by Queipo de Llano. Yagüe advanced northward, first seizing Mérida before attacking Badajoz with 3,000 troops on 14 August 1936. Bitter street fighting took place when the Nationalists advanced into the city. Yagüe's forces eventually gained control of Badajoz, with both sides suffering heavy casualties.

Under Yagüe's direction, hundreds of prisoners, military and civilians, were killed or executed in Badajoz during the Badajoz massacre. 

Before leaving the city, Yagüe was asked by the American journalist John T. Whitaker about his reason for killing 10% of the city's population and he answered: 

Yagüe was then promoted to colonel and afterwards advanced on Madrid, capturing Trujillo, Navalmoral de la Mata and Talavera de la Reina, but was unable to take the capital. He took part in the Aragon Offensive and seized control of Belchite, Caspe and Lérida. He also played a leading role in the Nationalist victory at the Ebro. In May 1938, Yagüe was removed from his command and imprisoned for injudicious remarks he made in a speech at Burgos, critical of Franco. He was back at the front within weeks. It was reportedly said that he was the only commander of Spanish forces that the Condor Legion respected. Yagüe never showed panic even when the enemy was close by, and was able to adjust battle plans quickly to suit changing circumstances.

Post-war

After the collapse of the Second Spanish Republic in 1939, Yagüe was promoted to major-general and appointed as Minister of the Air Force by General Franco. He was made a lieutenant general in 1942 and was posthumously promoted to commander-in-chief.

Notes

External links
 

|-

1891 births
1952 deaths
People from the Province of Soria
Spanish generals
People of the Rif War
Spanish military personnel of the Spanish Civil War (National faction)
Spanish anti-communists
Francoist Spain
Defence ministers of Spain
Government ministers during the Francoist dictatorship